Schedule 4 or Schedule IV may refer to:

Schedule IV Controlled Substances within the US Controlled Substances Act (List)
Schedule IV Controlled Drugs and Substances within the Canadian Controlled Drugs and Substances Act
 Schedule IV Psychotropic Substances within the Thai Psychotropic Substances Act
 Schedule IV Narcotic Drugs and Psychotropic Substances within the Estonian Narcotic Drugs and Psychotropic Substances Act
 Schedule IV Psychotropic Substances within the U.N. Convention on Psychotropic Substances
Schedule 4 of the Crown Minerals Act 1991 in New Zealand

See also 
Schedule 1 (disambiguation)
Schedule 2 (disambiguation)
Schedule 3 (disambiguation)
Schedule 5 (disambiguation)